Projapoti: The Mysterious Bird is a Bangladeshi film which was released in 2011. This film was directed by director of television Mohammad Mostafa Kamal Raz and it is his first film. This film is produced by Enayetur Rahman Bappy and under the banner of NTV Production House. Main star cast of the film was Moushumi, Zahid Hasan, Mosharraf Karim.

Story 
Tanvir (Zahid Hasan) is a gambler, but never wins and his family are run by his wife's income. His wife Rita (Moushumi) borrowed money from her relatives for his business purpose, but he loses everything in gambling. Tareq (Mosharraf Karim) is a rich man, but lonely, he has a cousin Babar who works for him. One day Tareq meets Tanvir while he is playing imagery cards alone in a park as he has no money.

Tareq lends Tanvir money for gambling and watches him playing. Story further develops and by then Tanvir has borrowed thousands of money from Tareq. One day Tareq refuses to lend money to Tanvir though he gets better cards and about to win. Tanvir uses his wife as a guarantee to Tareq in order to borrow money. However, Tanvir loses the bet and Rita is heartbroken to know the incident. She leaves Tanvir's house and shifts to Tareq's. Tareq tries to win Rita over and a lovesick Tanvir stays outside Tareq's residence to ask for Rita's forgiveness. Rita neither forgives Tanvir nor does she accept Tareq's love. In the end, Rita leaves Tareq's house without telling anyone and becomes a school teacher at a faraway village.

Cast
Zahid Hasan - Tanveer
Moushumi - Rita
Mosharraf Karim - Tareq
 Sohel Khan - Mahfuz
 Kochi Khondokar - 
 Toriqul Islam Tusher - Rita's Brother
 Kamal Hossain Babor - Babor

Soundtrack

The songs of this film were composed by Habib Wahid under the banner of G-Series. Lyrics were penned by Kabir Bakul, Shafiq Tuhin and Zahid Akbar.

Awards and nominations

See also
List of Bangladeshi films of 2011

References

External links
 

2011 films
Bengali-language Bangladeshi films
Films scored by Habib Wahid
2010s Bengali-language films